USS Pennsylvania R. R. No. 9 (SP-679), also known as USS Penn R. R. No. 9 (SP-679) and USS P.R.R. No. 9 (SP-679), was a United States Navy armed tug and minesweeper in commission from 1917 to 1919.

Pennsylvania R. R. No. 9 was built as a commercial tug of the same name by William R. Trigg at Richmond, Virginia, in 1904. She also was listed as Penn R. R. No. 9 and P.R.R. No. 9. In September 1917, the U.S. Navy acquired her from her owner, the Pennsylvania Railroad, for use during World War I. Delivered to the Navy on 18 September 1917 and assigned the section patrol number 679, she was commissioned on 22 September 1917 as USS Pennsylvania R. R. No. 9 (SP-679), being listed also as USS Penn R. R. No. 9 and USS P.R.R. No. 9.

After fitting out, Pennsylvania R. R. No. 9 took up tug and minesweeping duties in New York Harbor for the rest of World War I and for several weeks after its conclusion.

Pennsylvania R. R. No. 9 was returned to the Pennsylvania Railroad on 2 January 1919, having remained active in naval service until that day.

References

Department of the Navy Naval History and Heritage Command Online Library of Selected Images: Civilian Ships: P.R.R. No.9 (American Harbor Tug, 1904). Also known as Pennsylvania R.R. No.9. Served as USS P.R.R. No.9 (SP-679) in 1917-1919
NavSource Online: Section Patrol Craft Photo Archive Pennsylvania R. R. No. 9 (SP 679)

Auxiliary ships of the United States Navy
World War I auxiliary ships of the United States
Minesweepers of the United States Navy
World War I minesweepers of the United States
Ships built in Richmond, Virginia
1904 ships